Engine Company 21 may refer to:

 Engine Company 21 (Chicago)
 Engine Company 21 (District of Columbia)